Lake Worth High School is a public high school located in the city of Lake Worth, Texas, in Tarrant County, United States and classified as a 4A school by the UIL.  It is a part of the Lake Worth Independent School District located in west central Tarrant County.   In 2013, the school was rated "Met Standard" by the Texas Education Agency.

Athletics
The Lake Worth Bullfrogs compete in these sports -

Volleyball, Cross Country, Football, Basketball, Powerlifting, Tennis, Track, Baseball, Softball and Soccer

State Titles
Boys Basketball 
1965(2A), 1966(2A)

References

External links
Lake Worth ISD website
Green Machine Booster Club

Public high schools in Tarrant County, Texas